Kristen Lorraine Grauman is a Professor of Computer Science at the University of Texas at Austin on leave as a research scientist at Facebook AI Research (FAIR). She works on computer vision and machine learning.

Early life and education 
Grauman studied computer science at Boston College, graduating summa cum laude in 2001. She joined Massachusetts Institute of Technology for her postgraduate studies, earning a Master of Science degree in 2003 followed by a PhD in 2006 supervised by Trevor Darrell. During her PhD Grauman worked as a research intern at Intel and Lawrence Berkeley National Laboratory.

Career and research
In 2007 Grauman was appointed Clare Boothe Luce Assistant Professor at University of Texas at Austin. Her research looks to develop algorithms that can categorise and detect objects. She is interested in how computer vision can solicit information from humans. She was promoted to Associate Professor with tenure in 2011.

She is an Alfred P. Sloan Foundation Fellow. She was awarded an Office of Naval Research young investigator award in 2012. In 2013 she was awarded a Pattern Analysis and Machine Intelligence (PAMI) Young Researcher Award. She is working on techniques to get computers to watch and summarise videos for easy viewing. The egocentric films will be used to aid the elderly and those with impaired-memories.

She has developed several patents for machine learning; including pyramid match kernel methods and a  technique to efficiently identifying images.

Grauman serves as associate editor-in-chief of the IEEE Transactions on Pattern Analysis and Machine Intelligence.  As of May 2018, Grauman is on leave at Facebook AI Research (FAIR).

Awards and honors 
Her awards and honors include:
2019 IEEE Elected Fellow
2018 International Association for Pattern Recognition J. K. Aggarwal Prize
 2017 University of Texas at Austin Academy of Distinguished Teachers
 2017 Helmholtz Prize
 2015 National Science Foundation CAREER Award in 2015.
2013 Presidential Early Career Award for Scientists and Engineers
 2012 University of Texas System Regents’ Outstanding Teaching Award
 2011 IEEE Intelligent Systems AI's Ten to Watch

References 

1979 births
Living people
American women computer scientists
Boston College alumni
Massachusetts Institute of Technology alumni
Massachusetts Institute of Technology faculty
University of Texas at Austin faculty
American computer scientists
American computer programmers
21st-century American scientists
American women academics
21st-century American women scientists